Gérald is a French male given name, a variant of the old Géraud and more common Gérard, both equivalent to Gerald in English.

People with the name include:
 Gérald Mossé
 Gérald de Palmas
 Gérald Leblanc

Less frequently the French name also occurs as the English name, without the accent:
 Gerald Messadié, Egypt-born French writer

It is also occasionally a French surname, as in:
 Jim Gérald (1889–1958), French actor

French-language surnames
French masculine given names